The Solemnity of the Ascension of Jesus Christ, also called Ascension Day, Ascension Thursday, or sometimes Holy Thursday, commemorates the Christian belief of the bodily Ascension of Jesus into heaven. It is one of the ecumenical (i.e., shared by multiple denominations) feasts of Christian churches, ranking with the feasts of the Passion and Pentecost. Following the account of  that the risen Jesus appeared for 40 days prior to his Ascension, Ascension Day is traditionally celebrated on a Thursday, the fortieth day of Easter; although some Christian denominations have moved the observance to the following Sunday. The day of observance varies by ecclesiastical province in many Christian denominations, as with Methodists and Catholics, for example.

Ascensiontide refers to the ten day period between the Feast of the Ascension and the Feast of Pentecost.

History
The observance of this feast is of great antiquity. Eusebius seems to hint at the celebration of it in the 4th century. At the beginning of the 5th century, Augustine of Hippo says that it is of Apostolic origin, and he speaks of it in a way that shows it was the universal observance of the Catholic Church long before his time. Frequent mention of it is made in the writings of John Chrysostom, Gregory of Nyssa, and in the Constitution of the Apostles. The Pilgrimage of Aetheria speaks of the vigil of this feast and of the feast itself, as they were kept in the church built over the grotto in Bethlehem in which Christ is traditionally regarded as having been born. It may be that prior to the 5th century the event narrated in the Gospels was commemorated in conjunction with the feast of Easter or Pentecost. Some believe that the much-disputed forty-third decree of the Synod of Elvira (c. 300) condemning the practice of observing a feast on the fortieth day after Easter and neglecting to keep Pentecost on the fiftieth day, implies that the proper usage of the time was to commemorate the Ascension along with Pentecost. Representations of the mystery are found in diptychs and frescoes dating as early as the 5th century. Hymns for this feast are found in the Georgian Chantbook of Jerusalem which contains material composed during the 5th century.

Western
The Latin terms used for the feast,  and, occasionally, signify that Christ was raised up by his own powers, and it is from these terms that the holy day gets its name. In the Book of Common Prayer of the Anglican Communion, "Holy Thursday" is listed as another name for Ascension Day. William Blake's poem "Holy Thursday" refers to Ascension Day; Thomas Pruen used the term to refer to Ascension Day in his Illustration of the Liturgy of the Church of England, published in 1820; however use of the term "Holy Thursday" to mean Ascension Day is rare, and the term is more generally applied by most Christian denominations to Maundy Thursday in Holy Week.

In Western Christianity, the earliest possible date is April 30 (as in 1818 and 2285), the latest possible date is June 3 (as in 1943 and 2038). In Roman Catholicism, the Ascension of the Lord is ranked as a Solemnity and is a Holy Day of Obligation. In the Anglican Communion, Ascension Day is a Principal Feast.

The three days before Ascension Thursday are sometimes referred to as the Rogation days, and the previous Sunday—the Sixth Sunday of Easter (or the Fifth Sunday  Easter)—as Rogation Sunday.

Ascension has a vigil and, since the 15th century, an octave, which is set apart for a novena of preparation for Pentecost.

In traditional Methodist usage, The Book of Worship for Church and Home (1965) provides the following Collect for Ascension Day, commonly called Holy Thursday:

Sunday observance

Roman Catholic parishes in a number of countries that do not observe the feast as a public holiday have obtained permission from the Vatican to move observance of the Feast of the Ascension from the traditional Thursday to the following Sunday, the Sunday before Pentecost. Similarly, the United Methodist Church allows the traditional celebration on Holy Thursday to be moved to Sunday. This is in keeping with a trend to move Holy Days of Obligation from weekdays to Sunday, to encourage more Christians to observe feasts considered important. The decision to move a feast is made by each Conference of Catholic Bishops with prior approval of the Apostolic See. In some cases the Conference may delegate the determination for specific feasts to the bishops of an ecclesiastical province within the conference, i.e. an archbishop and the neighbouring bishops. The switch to Sunday was made in 1992 by the church in Australia; before 1996 in parts of Europe; in 1997 in Ireland; before 1998 in Canada and parts of the western United States; in many other parts in the United States from 1999; and in England and Wales from 2007 to 2017, but in 2018 reinstated to Thursday. In the U.S., the determination of whether to move Ascension was delegated to the provinces by the USCCB, and the ecclesiastical provinces which retain Thursday observance in 2022 are Boston, Hartford, New York, Newark, Omaha, Philadelphia, and the Personal Ordinariate of the Chair of Saint Peter. When celebrated on Sunday, the earliest possible date is May 3, and the latest is June 6.

Eastern and Oriental Orthodox
In the Eastern Church this feast is known in Greek as Analepsis, the "taking up", and also as the Episozomene, the "salvation from on high", denoting that by ascending into his glory Christ completed the work of our redemption. Ascension is one of the Twelve Great Feasts of the Orthodox liturgical year.

Celebration
The feast is always observed with an All-night vigil. The day before is the Apodosis (leave-taking) of Easter (i.e., the last day of the Feast of Easter). Before the Vigil, the Paschal hours are said for the last time and the Paschal greeting is exchanged.

A Lity is celebrated. The troparion of the day is sung, which says:

During the Polyeleos at Matins, the Epitaphios, which was placed on the altar on Holy Saturday (either at Matins or the Midnight Office, depending on local custom) is taken from the altar and carried in procession around the church. It is then put in the place reserved for it. The kontakion is sung, which announces:

The megalynarion and irmos from Ode IX of the Canon (also sung at liturgy) is:

At the Divine Liturgy, special antiphons are sung in place of Psalms 102 and 145 and the Beatitudes.

Observance
Ascension Thursday also commemorates the Holy Georgian Martyrs of Persia (17th–18th centuries).

Ascension has an Afterfeast of eight days. The Sunday after Ascension is the Sunday of the Holy Fathers of the First Ecumenical Council at Nicaea. This council formulated the Nicene Creed up to the words, "He (Jesus) ascended into heaven, and sits at the right hand of the Father; and shall come again, with glory, to judge the living and the dead; Whose kingdom shall have no end." The Afterfeast ends on the following Friday, the Friday before Pentecost. The next day is appropriately a Saturday of the Dead (general commemoration of all faithful departed).

The Eastern Orthodox Church uses a different method of calculating the date of Easter, so the Eastern Orthodox commemoration of Ascension will usually be after the western observance (either one week, or four weeks, or five weeks later; but occasionally on the same day). The earliest possible date for the feast is May 13 (of the western calendar), and the latest possible date is June 16. Some of the Oriental Orthodox Churches, however, observe Ascension on the same date as the Western Churches.

Music
The feast has been associated with specific hymns and other church music. The oldest hymn in German related to the feast is the Leise "Christ fuhr gen Himmel", first published in 1480. Johann Sebastian Bach composed several cantatas and the Ascension Oratorio to be performed in church services on the feast day. He first performed Wer da gläubet und getauft wird, BWV 37, on 18 May 1724, Auf Christi Himmelfahrt allein, BWV 128, on 10 May 1725, Gott fähret auf mit Jauchzen, BWV 43, on 30 May 1726 and the oratorio, Lobet Gott in seinen Reichen, BWV 11, on 19 May 1735.

Many Messianic psalms are used at the feast of Ascension including Psalm 24, Psalm 47 and Psalm 68. The dialogue "Lift up your heads, O ye gates" from Psalm 24 (verses 7–10) has inspired Handel's setting in Part II of his Messiah in the scene "Ascension", and Christoph Bernhard Verspoell's 1810 hymn in German, "". Phillip Moore's anthem The Ascension sets words based on the same verses. 

Olivier Messiaen wrote an orchestral suite, later partly transcribed for organ, called L'Ascension in the 1930s. 

Settings of "God is gone up" have been composed by William Croft, Arthur Hutchings and Gerald Finzi (words by Edward Taylor). Other settings suitable for the occasion include William Matthias's Lift up your heads. "Im Himmel hoch verherrlicht ist" (Highly gloryfied in Heaven) is a 1973 hymn in German for the occasion.

The RSCM has produced an extensive list of music (including hymns, anthems and organ music) suitable for Ascension.

See also

 Ascension of Jesus in Christian art
 Feast of the Transfiguration

References

Acts of the Apostles
Eastertide
Christian terminology
May observances
June observances
Thursday observances
Public holidays in Denmark
Public holidays in Sweden
Public holidays in Norway
Public holidays in Iceland
April observances
Ascension of Jesus
Christian processions